Kuusela is a Finnish surname. Notable people with the surname include:

Walter Kuusela (1903–1985), Finnish farmworker, farmer and politician
Keijo Kuusela (1921-1984), Finnish ice hockey players
Seppo Kuusela (1934–2014), Finnish basketball player, basketball coach, and handball player
Armi Kuusela (born 1934), Finnish beauty queen, Miss Universe 1952
Martti Kuusela (born 1945), Finnish football manager
Panu Kuusela (born 1979), Finnish footballer
Kristian Kuusela (born 1983), Finnish professional ice hockey player
Joonas Kuusela (born 1990), Finnish professional ice hockey goaltender

Finnish-language surnames
Surnames of Finnish origin